The 1832 Democratic National Convention was held from May 21 to May 23, 1832, in Baltimore, Maryland. In the first presidential nominating convention ever held by the Democratic Party, incumbent President Andrew Jackson was nominated for a second term, while former Secretary of State Martin Van Buren was nominated for vice president.

The Anti-Masonic Party and the National Republican Party had held the first presidential nominating conventions in 1831, and Jackson's "Kitchen Cabinet" helped organize a Democratic convention in 1832.

As the party leaders assumed that Jackson would be nominated for president, the primary purpose of the convention was to find a new running mate: Vice President John C. Calhoun had fallen out with Jackson following the Petticoat affair and the Nullification Crisis, and subsequently resigned the office in order to take a Senate seat.

The convention, which was presided over by Governor Robert Lucas, hosted delegates from every state except Missouri; Jackson won the presidential nomination unanimously.

With Jackson's strong endorsement, Van Buren easily won the vice presidential nomination on the first ballot, defeating former Representative Philip P. Barbour of Virginia and Representative Richard Mentor Johnson of Kentucky. The Democratic ticket of Jackson and Van Buren went on to win the 1832 presidential election.

Background 
In the summer of 1822, "Richmond Junto" leader Thomas Ritchie of Virginia began raising the idea of a national convention to resolve the issue of nomination; ultimately, the Congressional nominating caucus was appealed to by the devotees of Treasury Secretary William H. Crawford's candidacy. Following that defeat in the election of 1824, early in 1827, Van Buren privately made the argument to Richie for an exclusive national convention of Republicans to ensure Jackson's nomination. However, it did not immediately come to fruition while state conventions and legislatures took up Jackson as their presidential candidate for the election of 1828 with Vice President John C. Calhoun as his running mate. Such a type of national convention would occur after the election.

Calhoun soon became politically estranged from President Jackson, due in part to an 1830 letter written by Crawford stating that Calhoun, as Secretary of War under President James Monroe, pushed for a reprimand of then-General Jackson for his actions in the 1818 invasion of Florida. The Petticoat affair in which Calhoun's wife, Floride, was a central figure further alienated Jackson from the vice president and his supporters. The final blow to the relationship came in January 1832, when Calhoun, as President of the Senate, sank Van Buren's nomination as Minister to Great Britain by casting a tie-breaking vote in the United States Senate. Consequently, Calhoun was replaced as the party's 1832 vice presidential nominee by Van Buren. Later that year, on December 28, he resigned as vice president, after having been elected to the U.S. Senate. There he continued to be a proponent of the doctrine of nullification in opposition to Jackson.

The proposal for the convention began with members of Jackson's "Kitchen Cabinet", his coterie of informal advisers and confidants. Major William Berkeley Lewis wrote on May 25, 1831, to Amos Kendall, who was then in New Hampshire. He proposed that the New Hampshire legislature call for a national gathering of Republican supporters of the Jackson administration to nominate a candidate for the vice presidency, and asked Kendall to pass the idea to Isaac Hill. After the New Hampshire legislature issued the call for a general convention, the Washington Globe, the principal Jacksonian newspaper, seconded the recommendation on July 6, 1831:

Lewis later recalled warning former Secretary of War and delegate John Eaton the day before the convention not to vote for anyone there except Van Buren unless he was prepared to "quarrel with the General [Jackson]."

Proceedings 
The convention was called to order by Frederick A. Sumner of New Hampshire, who said of the origins and purpose of the convention:

Delegates from all states except Missouri were present. Governor Robert Lucas of Ohio served as the chairman and convention president. Peter Vivian Daniel, James Fenner, John M. Barclay, and Augustin Smith Clayton were chosen as convention vice presidents. John Adams Dix was appointed secretary at the first meeting, with other additional secretaries thereafter. A resolution was passed by the convention requiring two-thirds majority support of the delegates for a nomination.

An address by the Republican delegates of New York gave a history of previous national political activity in the United States. They denounced the National Republicans as Federalists under a new designation and they denounced the Nullifiers while they declared that their own party held the middle ground between the positions of the other two. The address described what they claimed were political similarities between Andrew Jackson and Thomas Jefferson and it defended the policies of Jackson's administration. It characterized Van Buren as a strict constructionist and welcomed his nomination.

The convention concluded by adopting a resolution calling for an address or report from the delegations to their constituents.

Presidential nomination 

Jackson was nominated for re-election by acclaimation.

Vice Presidential nomination

Vice Presidential candidates 

Martin Van Buren was nominated for vice president on the first ballot after receiving 208 votes of the 283 cast, 19 more than the two-thirds majority required to win.

General election 
Andrew Jackson and Martin Van Buren defeated their main competitors, Henry Clay and John Sergeant of the National Republican Party, by a large electoral vote margin in the election of 1832.

See also 
 History of the United States Democratic Party
 List of Democratic National Conventions
 U.S. presidential nomination convention
 1832 United States presidential election

Notes

References

External links 
 Summary of the Proceedings of a Convention of Republican Delegates, from the Several States in the Union, for the Purpose of Nominating a Candidate for the Office of Vice-President of the United States; Held at Baltimore, in the State of Maryland, May, 1832: With an Address, to the Republicans of the State of New-York, Prepared by their Delegates, in Compliance with the Recommendation of Said Convention, Democratic National Convention (1832). Albany, New York: Packard and Van Benhuysen.

1832 United States presidential election
1832 in Maryland
19th century in Baltimore
Political conventions in Baltimore
Maryland Democratic Party
Political events in Maryland
Democratic National Conventions
1832 conferences
May 1832 events